Vedavathi Government First Grade College is a college in Karnataka. It was established in 1993 and was affiliated to Kuvempu University until 2008 and to Davangere University since then.

Government degree Colleges in Karnataka
Educational institutions established in 1995
Universities and colleges in Shimoga district
1995 establishments in Karnataka
Kuvempu University